Rooftop Soundcheck is the debut album by hip hop group Justice System. It was released in 1994 by MCA Records. It includes tributes to Afrika Bambaataa and Santana.

Track listing

References

1994 debut albums
Hip hop albums by American artists
MCA Records albums